The Outhere Brothers are an American hip house and Eurodance duo, composed of Keith "Malik" Mayberry and record producer Lamar "Hula" Mahone. While they achieved only moderate success in their native United States, two of their singles, "Boom Boom Boom" and "Don't Stop (Wiggle Wiggle)", topped the chart in the United Kingdom in 1995. In the same year, they also contributed to Molella's "If You Wanna Party", which also peaked within the top ten of the charts in the United Kingdom.

Discography

Studio albums
1 Polish, 2 Biscuits & a Fish Sandwich (1994) – AUS No. 90, NLD No. 64, UK No. 56
Party Album (1995) – UK No. 46
The Other Side (1998)

Compilation albums
The Fucking Hits (2002)
Dance History (2004)

Singles

References

External links
The Outhere Brothers on Myspace

African-American musical groups
American hip hop groups
American musical duos
Dirty rap musicians
Hip hop duos
American Eurodance groups
Hip house music groups
Musical groups established in 1987
Musical groups from Chicago
Rappers from Chicago